The Bye Aerospace Sun Flyer (also previously known as the Aero Electric Aircraft Corporation Sun Flyer) is an electric aircraft that was developed from the PC-Aero Elektra One by Bye Aerospace's Aero Electric Aircraft Corporation division of Denver, Colorado, United States, introduced in 2015. The company had a license agreement and engineering contract for the design with Calin Gologan, the Elektra One's designer.

Design and development
The aircraft features composite construction, a cantilever low-wing, a single-seat, enclosed cockpit under a bubble canopy, fixed tricycle landing gear with wheel pants and a single electric motor in tractor configuration.

The Sun Flyer differed from the PC-Aero Elektra One by incorporating new landing gear, propeller and instruments. It provided a prototype for a proposed two-seater that was to have four Panasonic lithium-ion batteries, along with solar panels installed on the wings, horizontal tail and on the fuselage behind the canopy. This two-seater was intended to be certified for day and night Visual Flight Rules. The proposed two-seat version of the Sun Flyer eventually led to a new design, the Bye Aerospace Sun Flyer 2 instead.

The Spartan College of Aeronautics and Technology had reserved the first 20 two-seat models that were to be produced.

Specifications (Sun Flyer)

See also
List of electric aircraft

References

External links

Sun Flyer
2010s United States sport aircraft
2010s United States civil utility aircraft
Single-engined tractor aircraft
Low-wing aircraft
Electric aircraft